Roman Sergeevich Kalinin (born 1984) is a Russian rapist and serial killer, who operated in the Chitinsky District of the Zabaykalsky Krai, killing 4 people between 2003 and 2009.

Crimes 
On the night of June 21, 2003, Kalinin and his acquaintance Denis Redrov were resting in the Chita cafe "Gan Bay", where they met two schoolgirls. They lured one of the girls in the Memorial Park of the Fighting and Labor Glory of the Trans-Baikal Region, where she was raped and killed. Then the criminals brought to the park and then killed the other girl, because they feared that she could inform the police about the crime that they had committed. After the second murder, they decided to simulate a robbery attack on the victims: they took gold jewelry, a pager and a cosmetic bag from the dead, and then threw the bodies into the Chita River.

In the summer of 2009, Kalinin met with a female student in Chita, and invited her to a vacation outside the city. The student took a friend with her on the trip. On June 17, the three of them arrived by train to the station "Glubokaya Pad", from which they reached the dacha cooperative "Lokomotiv-82". On one of the abandoned dachas, Kalinin raped and killed his new acquaintance. Before that, he had lured into the forest and killed her friend. He took off the gold ornaments and broken cell phones from the dead, and disposed of them in the forest.

On June 19, the Railway Police Department received a statement about the two missing girls. On June 23, the main suspect in the murders, Kalinin, was detained. According to his testimony on June 25, operatives detained at Yekaterinburg's airport the accomplice to the first murders, Redrov, and then brought him back to Chita. Both soon acknowledged their guilt.

On February 4, 2010, the Trans-Baikal Regional Court sentenced Roman Kalinin to life imprisonment in a correctional special regime colony, while Redrov was given 19 years imprisonment in a corrective labor colony. In addition, the court ordered both convicts to pay compensation to the victims' families for more than 1.3 million rubles. The Supreme Court of Russia upheld the verdict without changes, and cassation appeals were rejected.

See also
 List of Russian serial killers

References

External links 
 Alexey Subbotin: In the Trans-Baikal Territory, rapist-killers were convicted; one sentenced to life imprisonment. TASS Siberia (February 4, 2010)

1984 births
Living people
Male serial killers
People from Chita, Zabaykalsky Krai
Prisoners sentenced to life imprisonment by Russia
Russian murderers of children
Russian rapists
Russian serial killers